The Academia de Artes (AA) is the Mexican Academy of Arts founded 1967/1968 by CONACULTA for the promotion of Mexican art. Seat of the institution is the Museo Nacional de San Carlos in Mexico City. The Slogan of the Acadademy is elevación por el arte (elevation/refinement through art).

Faculties 
 architecture
 sculpture
 graphics 
 art history and art critics
 music
 painting
 stagecrafts

External links 
 Academia de Artes

Art schools in Mexico
Architecture schools
Education in Mexico City
Schools in Mexico City
Arts organizations based in Mexico
Organizations based in Mexico City